There are two municipalities called Saint-Stanislas in Quebec:
Saint-Stanislas, Mauricie, Quebec in Les Chenaux Regional County Municipality
Saint-Stanislas, Saguenay–Lac-Saint-Jean, Quebec in Maria-Chapdelaine Regional County Municipality